The Superior International Junior Hockey League (SIJHL) is a junior A ice hockey league and a member of the Canadian Junior Hockey League (CJHL) and Hockey Canada.  The league operates in the Canadian province of Ontario and the U.S. states of Minnesota and Wisconsin.  Winners of the SIJHL playoffs compete for the Dudley Hewitt Cup against the winners of the Ontario Junior Hockey League and the Northern Ontario Junior Hockey League. The winner of the Dudley Hewitt Cup then moves on to compete for the Centennial Cup, the Canadian Junior A championship.

History

Background

Founded in 2001, the SIJHL is successor of several former Thunder Bay junior A hockey leagues and teams. The Fort William War Veterans were the first representatives of the Thunder Bay region, winning the 1922 Memorial Cup as Canadian National Junior A Champions. Although there is not abundant information on the subject, the Thunder Bay Junior Hockey League may date back to the War Veterans and existed until 1980. From 1980 until 2000, the region (Hockey Northwestern Ontario) was represented by a single team at the junior A level: the Thunder Bay Flyers. The Flyers played their regular season games in the United States Hockey League (USHL), a USA Hockey junior A league, and returned to Canada for the playoffs. The Flyers won the Dudley Hewitt Cup as Central Canadian Junior Champions in 1989, 1991, 1992, and 1995. The Flyers were also National Champions in 1989 and 1992, winning the Centennial Cup. The Flyers folded after the 1999–2000 USHL Season.

The Northwestern Ontario region has also been represented in the past in the Manitoba Junior Hockey League.  From 1968 until 1982, the city of Kenora, Ontario, was represented by the Kenora Muskies/Thistles and in the mid-1980s, Thunder Bay had an entry with the Thunder Bay Hornets.

The folding of the Thunder Bay Flyers led to the rebirth of junior A hockey in the Thunder Bay region. The league started under the "Superior International" label in 2001 with five teams, including the Dryden Ice Dogs, First Nation Featherman Hawks, Fort Frances Borderland Thunder, Thunder Bay Bulldogs, and the Thunder Bay Wolves.

2006 Dudley Hewitt Cup
In 2006, the Fort William North Stars won the Dudley Hewitt Cup with a 7–6 overtime win over the Northern Ontario Junior Hockey League's Sudbury Jr. Wolves to earn the team and the league its first regional title and its first shot at the national title in the 2006 Royal Bank Cup. The North Stars were eliminated in the Royal Bank Cup semifinal in Brampton, Ontario, with a 3–2 overtime loss to the British Columbia Hockey League's Burnaby Express led by eventual NHL player Kyle Turris.

Expansion and retraction
The presence of the SIJHL in Northwestern Ontario marks the first time since the 1970s that the region has effectively supported a junior hockey league.  In 2007, the SIJHL expanded east of Thunder Bay with the Schreiber Diesels and Marathon Renegades. A Wawa, Ontario, franchise was also in the works, but never came to fruition.

On December 17, 2007, the Schreiber Diesels folded mid-season claiming lack of fan support. On December 21, the team was bought by a group of local fans in an effort to keep the Diesels alive. The Marathon Renegades at one point were as high as third place in the SIJHL during the 2007–08 season, but after 37 games played were forced to cancel the rest of its season citing a lack of players through injuries and player defections to other leagues. Al Cresswell, team president, claimed that the shortage of players had become a health risk.

Although the 2008–09 season did not see a return to Marathon, the SIJHL did add the Sioux Lookout Flyers. In the 2008 off-season, the Thunder Bay Bulldogs elected to retract to embolden the Thunder Bay Bearcats. Despite a strong year from the Bearcats and the Schreiber Diesels, both teams elected to cease operation in the summer of 2009. The Fort Frances Jr. Sabres claimed that they would be back for 2009–10, but their owners sold the rights to their players to teams across Canada. In a last-ditch effort, the town of Fort Frances bought the team and renamed them the Fort Frances Lakers, but were forced to find all new players due to the actions of the previous ownership. The Thunder Bay Wolverines elected to apply for promotion to the SIJHL for 2009–10 fresh off of their silver medal performance at the Keystone Cup Canadian Jr. B Championships. Back up to five teams, the SIJHL also made a 20-game interleague setup with the Minnesota Junior Hockey League's Wisconsin Mustangs to diversify the league's competition.

Tenth season and American expansion
The 2010–11 season was the tenth season of the SIJHL. The SIJHL received applications for expansion by two American teams: the Duluth Clydesdales and Wisconsin Mustangs.

In June, the Thunder Bay Wolverines pulled out of the SIJHL. A few days later USA Hockey rejected the transfer bid by the Wisconsin Mustangs to join the SIJHL and the expansion bid of the potential of Duluth, Minnesota, despite approval by Hockey Canada and the SIJHL. The league sat at four teams. The two teams appealed the decision and won, officially giving the league six teams and making the league an international league.

The Fort William North Stars were dominant early in 2010–11, but due to financial difficulties, the team was sold to new ownership and became the Thunder Bay North Stars. The Wisconsin Wilderness jumped into the lead mid-season and won the regular season and playoff titles in their first season in the league.

In the summer of 2011, the SIJHL elected to expand with the Iron Range Ironheads awaiting the permission of USA Hockey and Minnesota Hockey. USA Hockey again denied the league. The decision was appealed and on July 12, 2011, expansion was allowed by USA Hockey as well as the continuation of the Duluth and Spooner franchises. Wisconsin won their second straight league title, coming from behind in the final to beat the Fort Frances Lakers in seven games.

The 2012–13 season was a season of decline for the league's American expansion. During the off-season, USA Hockey allowed the league to transfer Iron Range to new ownership and rename it the Minnesota Iron Rangers. Wisconsin was sold and relocated into the same market as Duluth and renamed the Minnesota Wilderness. Three games into the season, the Sioux Lookout Flyers ceased operations and eventually their franchise when a scandal over the carding of players by their new general manager and coach left them without enough players to continue. In early 2013, the league, after multiple cancelled games, stripped the Duluth Clydesdales of their franchise. Then, after clinching their third regular season and playoff crowns, the Wilderness won the league's second ever Dudley Hewitt Cup as Central Canadian champions.  Minnesota Wilderness became the first American team to win the Dudley Hewitt Cup and the first to gain berth into the Royal Bank Cup Canadian Junior A Championship. After winning the Central Canadian Championship, it was announced that the Wilderness would leave the SIJHL at the end of the Royal Bank Cup to join the North American Hockey League, a USA Hockey-sanctioned Tier II league. The Wilderness finished fourth in the National Championship round-robin, earning a berth into the semi-final. Despite leading 4–2 in the third, the Wilderness took too many penalties and lost their lead with seconds to go in the third period. The Alberta Junior Hockey League's Brooks Bandits scored in overtime to win the game 5–4 eliminating the Wilderness. With the Wilderness and Clydesdales gone, the Minnesota Iron Rangers were the remaining American team with membership in the league.

In the spring of 2013, the SIJHL announced expansion to Ear Falls, Ontario, with the English River Miners and on July 11, 2013, admitted a new team in Spooner, Wisconsin, also called the Wisconsin Wilderness. The new Wilderness lasted one season.

In the summer of 2014, commissioner and president Ron Whitehead was relieved of his post. Whitehead held his position from 2005 until 2014 and had been a member of the league executive since its inception in 2001. In 2011, Hockey Northwestern Ontario named Whitehead their Central Zone volunteer of the year.

The league added a second team in Minnesota and their sixth franchise for 2016–17 season with the Thief River Falls Norskies. In 2019, the league added another team in Spooner, Wisconsin, called the Wisconsin Lumberjacks for the 2019–20 season. After several seasons of ownership issues and lack of player recruitment, the Minnesota Iron Rangers ceased operations for the 2019–20 season, returning the league to six teams. The 2019–20 season was then curtailed by the COVID-19 pandemic with one week left in the regular season and no postseason tournaments were held. The ongoing pandemic border-crossing restrictions caused the two American teams to withdraw from the 2020–21 season while the league added a new team called the Kam River Fighting Walleye. The five Canadian teams would play a few games in November and December 2020 along with two U18 minor teams, the Kenora Thistles and Thunder Bay Kings, to fill in the schedule before the season was cancelled entirely.

Teams

Former member teams

Former interleague teams
Iron Range Yellow Jackets (2001–02)
Minot State University-Bottineau Lumberjacks (2005–06)
Northwest Wisconsin Knights (2001–03)

Bill Salonen Cup champions

The winners of the SIJHL Playoffs are awarded the Bill Salonen Cup. Although the Jack Adams Trophy is supposed to be awarded to the branch Junior A champion, Hockey Northwestern Ontario will not bring it out unless there are two leagues vying for the branch championship.

Dudley Hewitt Cup

Single-season team records
Best Winning Record:
2005-06 Fort William North Stars - 50-2-0-0
Most Goals For:
2018-19 Thunder Bay North Stars - 363 
Fewest Goals Against:
2004-05 Fort William North Stars - 66 
Worst Winning Record:
2008-09 Sioux Lookout Flyers - 2-46-0-2
Fewest Goals For:
2004-05 Thunder Bay Bulldogs - 72 
Most Goals Against:
2018-19 Minnesota Iron Rangers - 478

Timeline of teams in the SIJHL
2001–02
SIJHL is founded with five teams: Dryden Ice Dogs, Featherman Hawks, Fort Frances Borderland Thunder, Thunder Bay Bulldogs and Thunder Bay Wolves; as well as two interleague teams: Iron Range Yellow Jackets and Northwest Wisconsin Knights
2002–03
Thunder Bay Wolves become Fort William Wolves
Featherman Hawks become Nipigon Golden Hawks
Iron Range Yellow Jackets break off interlock
2003–04
Nipigon Golden Hawks move to Thunder Bay and become K&A Golden Hawks
Fort William Wolves become Fort William North Stars
Northwest Wisconsin Knights break off interlock
2005–06
Schreiber Diesels join league
Fort Frances Borderland Thunder leaves league
MSU-Bottineau Lumberjacks enter into interlocking schedules
2006–07
Marathon Renegades join league
Thunder Bay Golden Hawks become Thunder Bay Bearcats
MSU-Bottineau Lumberjacks break off interlock
Fort Frances Jr. Sabres join league
2007–08
Marathon Renegades withdraw from league mid-season (January)
2008–09
Sioux Lookout Flyers join league
Thunder Bay Bulldogs merge into Thunder Bay Bearcats
2009–10
Schreiber Diesels leave league
Thunder Bay Bearcats leave league
Fort Frances Jr. Sabres are renamed Fort Frances Lakers
Thunder Bay Wolverines join league from Thunder Bay Junior B Hockey League
Wisconsin Mustangs enter into interlocking schedule
2010–11
Thunder Bay Wolverines leave league
Wisconsin Wilderness (formerly Mustangs) join league from Minnesota Junior Hockey League
Duluth Clydesdales join league
2011–12
Iron Range Ironheads join league
2012–13
Iron Range Ironheads change name to Minnesota Iron Rangers
Wisconsin Wilderness relocate and become Minnesota Wilderness
Sioux Lookout Flyers cease operations
League revokes Duluth Clydesdales franchise
2013–14
Minnesota Wilderness leave league for North American Hockey League
English River Miners join league
New Wisconsin Wilderness join league
2014–15
Wisconsin Wilderness folded
2016–17
Thief River Falls Norskies joins league
2018–19
English River Miners rebranded to Red Lake Miners
2019–20
Wisconsin Lumberjacks joins league
Minnesota Iron Rangers suspended

References

External links
SIJHL website
Hockey Northwestern Ontario website

 
Canadian Junior Hockey League members
Hockey Northwestern Ontario
Ice hockey in Minnesota
Ice hockey in Wisconsin
A
A